William James Connell (July 6, 1846 – August 16, 1924) was an American Republican Party politician.

Born in Cowansville, Quebec, he immigrated with his family to Schroon Lake, New York in 1857 and then moved to Vermont in 1862. He moved to Omaha, Nebraska in 1867 and studied law. He was admitted to the bar in 1869.

He was the district attorney of the third judicial district of Nebraska from 1872 to 1876 and a city attorney for the city of Omaha from 1883 to 1887. He was elected to the Fifty-first United States Congress, serving from March 4, 1889, to March 3, 1891. He was an unsuccessful candidate for reelection in 1890. He returned to his job as Omaha's city attorney in 1892. He died in Atlantic City, New Jersey on August 16, 1924, and is buried in Prospect Hill Cemetery, Omaha.

His son, Dr. Karl Albert Connell, invented the gas mask used by American troops during World War I.

References
 
 
 
 

1846 births
1924 deaths
Nebraska lawyers
Pre-Confederation Canadian emigrants to the United States
People from Cowansville
Politicians from Omaha, Nebraska
Burials at Prospect Hill Cemetery (North Omaha, Nebraska)
Republican Party members of the United States House of Representatives from Nebraska
Lawyers from Omaha, Nebraska
19th-century American lawyers